Liakat Kablay is a politician from Botswana. He is the Member of Parliament for Letlhakeng-Lephephe and the Botswana Democratic Party Chief Whip.

References 

Living people
Year of birth missing (living people)
21st-century Botswana politicians
Botswana Democratic Party politicians
Members of the National Assembly (Botswana)
Chief Government Whips (Botswana)